Evelise Maria Tavares da Veiga (born 3 March 1996) is a Portuguese long jumper who also competes in triple jump events. She won two silver medals at the 2019 Summer Universiade in Naples, Italy.

International competitions

References

External links
 

1996 births
Living people
People from Santiago, Cape Verde
Portuguese female long jumpers
Universiade silver medalists for Portugal
Universiade medalists in athletics (track and field)
Black Portuguese sportspeople
Athletes (track and field) at the 2018 Mediterranean Games
Medalists at the 2019 Summer Universiade
Mediterranean Games competitors for Portugal
Athletes (track and field) at the 2020 Summer Olympics
Olympic athletes of Portugal
European Games competitors for Portugal
Athletes (track and field) at the 2019 European Games
20th-century Portuguese women
21st-century Portuguese women
Athletes (track and field) at the 2022 Mediterranean Games
Mediterranean Games medalists in athletics
Mediterranean Games bronze medalists for Portugal
World Athletics Championships athletes for Portugal

Portuguese people of Cape Verdean descent